Huda Naccache (or Huda Nakash) is an Arab-Israeli model. She was the first Arab (Christian) model to appear on the cover of an Arabic language magazine in a bikini and was Israel's representative to the Miss Earth beauty pageant in Philippines in December 2011.

Naccache  was one of the contestants on Israel's Survivor seventh season. She made it to the last 7.
 

Born to an Arab-Christian family, and her role as an swimsuit model has stimulated controversy from the Arab community. 

In 2017, she married Jewish-Israeli musician and sound recordist Roey Mula.

See also
Miss Earth 2011#Contestants
Rana Raslan
Lucy Ayoub
Mira Awad
Lucy Aharish

References

Israeli female models
Israeli Arab Christians
Year of birth missing (living people)
Living people
People from Haifa
Survivor (Israeli TV series) contestants
Arab citizens of Israel
Miss Earth 2011 contestants